Kevrola is a rural locality (a village) and the administrative center of Kevrolskoye Rural Settlement of Pinezhsky District, Arkhangelsk Oblast, Russia. The population was 447 as of 2010.

Geography 
Kevrola is located on the Pinega River, 10 km southeast of Karpogory (the district's administrative centre) by road. Aynova is the nearest rural locality.

References 

Rural localities in Pinezhsky District